AroundMe is a mobile application for iOS, Android and Windows Phone platforms that allows users to quickly find nearby points of interest (POI) such as restaurants, hotels, theaters, parking, hospitals and much more.

AroundMe was the first mobile application for the iPhone to use the Google's location-aware API and also was the first mobile application to make use of Google dynamic mobile advertisement. As of March 2009, over 5 million copies of AroundMe have been downloaded and installed.

Description

AroundMe uses the built-in smartphone navigation capabilities to perform location-aware searches.

A "Favorites" section allows the user save specific entries while the category "nearby" is used to identify nearby cities, parks, geographical locations, airports and attractions which are linked to appropriate Wikipedia entries.

Reception 

 Time Top 10 iPhone Apps (2008)
 Time 50 Best iPhone Apps (2011)

References

External links
 

IOS software
Location-based software
Android (operating system) software
Windows Phone software